Don Ellis Wilson (born April 30, 1944 in Davis, Oklahoma) is an American zoologist. His main research field is mammalogy, especially the group of bats which he studied in 65 countries around the world.

Career
Wilson spent his childhood and youth in Nebraska, Texas, Oregon and Washington. After finishing high school in Bisbee, Arizona in 1961 he graduated to Bachelor of Science from the University of Arizona in 1965. Still an under-graduate in 1964, he made his first expedition to the tropics, to which he travelled many times in the subsequent decades to study the mammalian fauna.

After working for the National Park Service in a fire lookout tower in the Grand Canyon National Park for one summer, he attended the graduate school of the University of New Mexico, where he graduated respectively in the discipline biology to Master of Science in 1967 and promoted to Ph.D. in 1970.

During this period he spent the summer months working as a naturalist for the U.S. Forest Service in the Sandia Mountains. His master thesis dealt with the relationships of five Peromyscus species in the Sandia Mountains in New Mexico, his dissertation with the small tropical insectivorous bat Myotis nigricans.

From 1986 to 1988, Wilson was president of the American Society of Mammalogists. In 1992, he was president of the Association for Tropical Biology and Conservation. In addition, he was editor of the Journal of Mammalogy for five years, and editor of the publications Mammalian Species and Special Publications for three years. He also worked in various editorial boards. He is on the board of the organizations Bat Conservation International, the Biodiversity Foundation for Africa, Integrated Conservation Research and in the Lubee Bat Conservancy.

Publications
Wilson published more than 270 scientific publications, including the book Mammals of New Mexico and three monographs on bats. In 1997, the book Bats in Question – The Smithsonian Answer Book was published. In 2005, he was co-editor (along with DeeAnn M. Reeder) of the reference work Mammal Species of the World. Since 2009, he is co-editor (with Russell Mittermeier) of the book series Handbook of the Mammals of the World, from the Spanish publishing house Lynx Edicions. In addition, he published the books Animal, Human, Smithsonian Handbook of Mammals and Mammal for the publisher Dorling Kindersley. He also authored a field guide to the North American mammal fauna as well as the work Smithsonian Book of North American Mammals.

Honors
Wilson won several awards, including the Smithsonian Institution Awards for outstanding contributions in the field of tropical biology, the Outstanding Publication Award from the U.S. Fish and Wildlife Service, the Gerrit S. Miller Award from the North American Symposium on Bat Research, and the Hartley H. T. Jackson Award of the American Society of Mammalogists. In addition he received recognition of the Asociacion Mexicana de Mastozoologia for his outstanding scientific achievement and he received an honorary membership of the American Society of Mammalogists.

A species of snake, Myriopholis wilsoni, is named in honor of Don E. Wilson.

Personal life
Wilson lives with his wife, whom he married in 1962 in Gainesville, Virginia. The couple has two daughters (who work as tutors) and four granddaughters.

References

Further reading
Perry, Matthew C. (ed.): The Washington Biologists' Field Club: Its Members and its history (1900–2006). Washington Biologists' Field Club, Washington, DC 2007, pp. 290–291.

External links
Member profile Smithsonian National Museum of Natural History
List of publications by Don E. Wilson at Google Scholar

1944 births
American mammalogists
Living people
People from Davis, Oklahoma
People from Gainesville, Virginia
Scientists from Virginia
University of Arizona alumni
University of New Mexico alumni